Les Bains Douches 18 December 1979 is a live album by English post-punk band Joy Division, partly recorded on 18 December 1979 at Les Bains Douches, Paris, and released in 2001 by record label NMC. Additional tracks are drawn from two other concerts.

Content

Album artwork 

The artwork was done by Peter Saville. The CD booklet contained a reprint of the original poster for the show.

Reception 

Pitchfork, commenting on Joy Division's live output, wrote: "Les Bains Douches, by itself, is flawless; of the available recordings there are none better".

Track listing 

All tracks written by Joy Division (Ian Curtis, Peter Hook, Stephen Morris and Bernard Sumner).

 "Disorder" – 3:21
 "Love Will Tear Us Apart" – 3:17
 "Insight" – 3:25
 "Shadowplay" – 3:46
 "Transmission" – 3:19
 "Day of the Lords" – 4:39
 "Twenty Four Hours" – 4:12
 "These Days" – 3:42
 "A Means to an End" – 4:17
 "Passover" – 2:18
 "New Dawn Fades" – 4:40
 "Atrocity Exhibition" – 6:56
 "Digital" – 3:39
 "Dead Souls" – 4:46
 "Autosuggestion" – 4:13
 "Atmosphere" – 4:47

 Note: Tracks 1–9 recorded at Les Bains Douches, Paris, 18 December 1979; tracks 10–12 recorded at Paradiso, Amsterdam, The Netherlands, 11 January 1980; and tracks 13–16 recorded at Effenaar, Eindhoven, The Netherlands, 18 January 1980.

References

External links 

 

Joy Division live albums
2001 live albums